In online chess, a premove is an input given by a player to the server during the player's opponent's turn that instructs the server to make a certain move on a certain turn in the future if possible. As with a normal move, a premove is done by dragging the piece to its destination, or by clicking the piece and then clicking its destination.

Premoving is available on chess websites such as the Internet Chess Club, the Free Internet Chess Server, Chess.com, and Lichess.

The Internet Chess Club allows players to block any players with premoving enabled.

Description
To premove, a player makes a move in the same way as they would move if it were their turn. After their opponent moves, the original player's move is immediately made, provided that the move is legal.

Some websites, such as Chess.com, offer the option of making multiple premoves at a time. Each premove is made in sequence if possible; however, if any premove fails to be executed, then it and all subsequent premoves in the sequence are cancelled.

Strategy
Premoving is used both recreationally and to avoid letting one's clock run out. Generally, it should only be done when either the move would be good in any subsequent position where it is valid or the player is in time trouble. It is most often used when anticipating a capture by an opponent so as to recapture the capturing piece.

References

External links
 ICC formula
 ICC help - Premove
 Chess.com - What are premoves and how do they work?

Chess terminology